"Baby Don't Get Hooked on Me" is a hit song by country and pop singer-songwriter Mac Davis. From his breakthrough album of the same name, the song reached No.1 on both the Billboard Hot 100 and Easy Listening charts in September 1972, spending three weeks atop each chart. Billboard ranked it as the No.8 song of 1972. Davis wrote it when the record company demanded he write a tune with a "hook".

The song was also a modest country hit concurrent with its pop success, reaching No.26 shortly after the peak of that success in the pop realm. It was featured on an episode of The Muppet Show that Mac Davis was hosting.

Chart performance

Weekly charts

Year-end charts

Covers
Blaine Larsen, on his 2006 album Rockin' You Tonight
Liza Minnelli, on her 1973 album The Singer
Rascal Flatts, used for their 2009 compilation The Vault

References

External links
 

1972 singles
Mac Davis songs
Number-one singles in Australia
Billboard Hot 100 number-one singles
Cashbox number-one singles
Songs written by Mac Davis
1972 songs
Columbia Records singles